My Home, My Life is a Canadian television documentary series for children, which premiered on TVOntario in 2020. The series features a number of children, both from Canada and internationally, presenting short video features on their home and family lives.

The series was originally conceived by sisters Georgina and Rennata Lopez. Although a pilot episode was shot at that time, the Lopez sisters did not actively pursue development as a series until the COVID-19 pandemic offered an opportunity to revisit it as a project that could be produced remotely. It launched in 2020 under the title My Stay-at-Home Diary, before changing its title to My Home, My Life in its second season.

The series was also carried in the United States by PBS.

The series received a Canadian Screen Award nomination for Best Children's or Youth Non-Fiction Program or Series at the 9th Canadian Screen Awards in 2021. At the 10th Canadian Screen Awards in 2022, it was nominated for Best Children's or Youth Non-Fiction Program or Series and Best Writing, Children's or Youth.

References

External links

2020 Canadian television series debuts
2020s Canadian children's television series
2020s Canadian documentary television series
TVO original programming
Television series about children